87th NYFCC Awards
December 3, 2021

Best Picture: 
Drive My Car

The 87th New York Film Critics Circle Awards, honoring the best in film for 2021, were announced on December 3, 2021.

The ceremony, which was originally scheduled to take place on January 10, 2022, was postponed due to COVID-19-related concerns involving the Omicron variant widespread surge throughout the U.S.; it ultimately took place at TAO Downtown Restaurant in New York on March 16, 2022.

Winners

 Best Film:
 Drive My Car
 Best Director:
 Jane Campion – The Power of the Dog
 Best Actor:
 Benedict Cumberbatch – The Power of the Dog
 Best Actress:
 Lady Gaga – House of Gucci
 Best Supporting Actor:
 Kodi Smit-McPhee – The Power of the Dog
 Best Supporting Actress:
 Kathryn Hunter – The Tragedy of Macbeth
 Best Screenplay:
 Paul Thomas Anderson – Licorice Pizza
 Best Animated Film:
 The Mitchells vs. the Machines
 Best Cinematography:
 Janusz Kamiński – West Side Story
 Best Non-Fiction Film:
 Flee
 Best Foreign Language Film:
 The Worst Person in the World • Norway
 Best First Film:
 The Lost Daughter
 Special Awards:
 Maya Cade for "the creation of the Black Film Archive".
 Marshall Fine for "his years of service as NYFCC's General Manager and decades on the NY film scene".
 Diane Weyermann: posthumous award for "supporting daring and impactful filmmaking at Sundance and Participant".

References

External links
 

New York Film Critics Circle Awards
New York
2021 in American cinema
2021 in New York City
New
Events postponed due to the COVID-19 pandemic